Chapeckia is a genus of fungi in the family Sydowiellaceae. The genus was described by mycologist Margaret Elizabeth Barr-Bigelow in 1978.

The genus name of Chapeckia is in honour of Charles Horton Peck (1833–1917), who was an American mycologist. He had described over 2,700 species of North American fungi.

Species
As accepted by Species Fungorum;
Chapeckia nigrospora 
Chapeckia ribesia

References

Sordariomycetes genera